Gazi Mehmet Pasha's Mosque also known as the Bajrakli Mosque is a mosque in the city of Prizren. It is one of the oldest Islamic religious sites in Kosovo. Building started in 1561 and finished in 1573. Its building is part of a complex which included the mosque, a library, a maktab and madrasa, public baths, housing and other buildings in a radius of about 150m. The present-day League of Prizren museum was one of its buildings. The complex stands on the other side of the Lumbardhi river opposite to the Prizren Fortress. The mosque has a square base and numerous windows, while the main mihrab and the mimber are made of marble.  

It was built by the waqf of Dukaginzade Gazi Mehmet Pasha, great-grandson of Dukaginzade Ahmed Pasha. His future mausoleum was built in the courtyard of the mosque, but it was never used as he died ca. 1594–96 in Hungary.

Bibliography

See also 
List of monuments in Prizren

References

Ottoman mosques in Kosovo
Mosques in Prizren
1561 establishments in the Ottoman Empire
16th-century mosques
Cultural heritage monuments in Prizren District